Ian Davies (born 15 January 1978) is a professional rugby union referee who represents the Welsh Rugby Union.

Rugby union career

Playing career

Amateur career

Davies broke his back playing rugby union when only 20 years old. Both his father and a team-mate suggested he move into refereeing the game.

Referee career

Professional career

Davies first game refereeing was Llantwit Major Youth v Llandaff Youth in 1998.

He made his Pro12 debut in April 2012.

He refereed his first 1872 Cup match on 26 December 2016.

Outside of rugby

Davies owns a financial advice practice.

References

Living people
Welsh rugby union referees
Rugby union officials
1978 births
1872 Cup referees
United Rugby Championship referees